The Division of Higgins is an Australian Electoral Division in Victoria for the Australian House of Representatives. Though historically a safe conservative seat, Higgins was won by the Liberal Party by a margin of just 3.9 percent over the Labor Party at the 2019 election, the closest result in the seat’s history. It then flipped to Labor in the 2022 election.

In June 2021, the AEC announced that the electoral division would include the locality of Windsor at the following federal election, but that part of the suburb of Glen Iris and the suburb of Hughesdale would be transferred to the Division of Kooyong and Division of Hotham respectively.

Higgins is a largely white-collar electorate. According to the 2016 census, 46.5% of electors hold a Bachelor's Degree, more than twice the national average.

The current member for Higgins, since the 2022 federal election, is Michelle Ananda-Rajah, a member of the Australian Labor Party, and the first Labor member in the seat's history.

Geography
Since 1984, federal electoral division boundaries in Australia have been determined at redistributions by a redistribution committee appointed by the Australian Electoral Commission. Redistributions occur for the boundaries of divisions in a particular state, and they occur every seven years, or sooner if a state's representation entitlement changes or when divisions of a state are malapportioned.

History 

The division was created in 1949. Like other seats in inner-eastern Melbourne, Higgins had historically been a stronghold for the Liberal Party. It was considered a "leadership seat", in part because the seat's first two members, Harold Holt and Sir John Gorton, were Prime Ministers of Australia in the period between 1966 and 1971.

More recently, the seat was held by the longest serving Treasurer of Australia and former Deputy Leader of the Liberal Party, Peter Costello, who was a prominent member of the Howard Government. Costello resigned from the seat on 19 October 2009, and was succeeded in the ensuing by-election by Kelly O'Dwyer, who would go on to become a minister in the Abbott and Turnbull governments.

O'Dwyer retired in 2019. At that election, Labor came reasonably close to winning this seat for the first time ever, with their highest two-party preferred vote in the history of the seat (46.12%). Liberal candidate Katie Allen, however, saw off a challenge from barrister Fiona McLeod, despite suffering a swing of six percent, making Higgins marginal against Labor for the first time ever. Allen became the first Liberal candidate to come up short of an outright majority on the first count. High-profile Greens candidate and former Australian Rules footballer Jason Ball also contested the seat, receiving almost a quarter of the vote.

At the 2022 election, Labor took the seat for the first time. While Allen led Labor challenger Michelle Ananda-Rajah for most of the night, on the seventh count the Green candidate's preferences flowed overwhelmingly to Ananda-Rajah, allowing Ananda-Rajah to win on a swing of 4.7 percent.

Higgins is the only Division to have been held by two Prime Ministers. This occurred when Holt went missing while Prime Minister, and then-Senator Gorton used the ensuing by-election to transfer to the House. Prior to 2022, it has only been out of Liberal hands for eight months in its existence, when Gorton became an independent to protest against Malcolm Fraser's becoming Liberal leader.

The seat is one of the few to have produced two federal Treasurers; Holt and Costello served as Treasurers during their respective tenure in Higgins. Another member, Kelly O'Dwyer had a stint as Assistant Treasurer.

Name
The division is named after Justice H. B. Higgins (1851–1929), who was a Member of the Victorian Legislative Assembly (1894) and president of the Carlton Football Club (1904). He was a founding Member of Australian House of Representatives, serving as the Protectionist member for Northern Melbourne and was the Attorney-General in the Watson Government (1904). He went on to become a Justice of the High Court of Australia (1906–1929)

Members

Election results

References

External links
 Division of Higgins – Australian Electoral Commission

Electoral divisions of Australia
Constituencies established in 1949
1949 establishments in Australia
City of Boroondara
City of Stonnington
City of Glen Eira
Electoral districts and divisions of Greater Melbourne